Totternhoe Castle was a Norman castle in Totternhoe. Bedfordshire. Only earthworks survive. It is a Scheduled Monument, and part of Totternhoe Knolls Site of Special Scientific Interest.

Details
Totternhoe Castle overlooks the village of Totternhoe in Bedfordshire, near the town of Dunstable. Built during the Norman period, probably during the years of the Anarchy, it is of a motte-and-bailey design, with two baileys rather than the more usual one. A wide ditch protects three sides of the castle, with the fourth protected by the edge of the chalk hill on which the castle is situated.

See also
Castles in Great Britain and Ireland
List of castles in England

References

Bibliography
Fry, Plantagenet Somerset. (2008) Castles. London: David and Charles. .
Pettifer, Adrian. (2002) English Castles: a Guide by Counties. Woodbridge, UK: Boydell Press. .

Castles in Bedfordshire